Christ Church is a Church of England parish church in Clifton, Bristol, England. It has been designated as a Grade II* listed building.

History
The church was built in 1841 by Charles Dyer. The steeple was built in 1859 by John Norton, and the aisles in 1885 by William Basset Smith.

A Christian mission organised here is credited with inspiring Emma Saunders to devote her life to good works. She spent fifty years as the "Railwayman's Friend" in Bristol starting in 1878.

In 2015 the church was closed for two weeks after the steeple was damaged in high winds.

The Anglican parish is part of the benefice of Christ Church with Emmanuel, Clifton which falls within the Diocese of Bristol. It is affiliated with the New Wine Network.

Architecture
The cruciform limestone building has a slate roof. It was built in the Early English Gothic Revival style. There is an octagonal apse. The north transept is supported by buttresses.

The steeple above the five-stage tower reaches . At its base is a doorway with Purbeck marble shafts. Inside the church is a west gallery supported by cast iron columns with timber cladding.

A replica of the church exists in Thames Town, a suburb of Shanghai built in a style imitative of English architecture.

Archives
Parish records for Christ Church, Clifton, Bristol are held at Bristol Archives (Ref. P.CC) (online catalogue) including baptism and marriage registers. The archive also includes records of the incumbent, churchwardens, parochial church council, charities and vestry.

See also

 List of tallest buildings and structures in Bristol
 Churches in Bristol
 Grade II* listed buildings in Bristol

References

External links
 Christ Church
 Christ Church, Clifton, on ChurchCrawler
 Gnu Tube: The Singers and Musicians of Christ Church Clifton

Churches completed in 1841
19th-century Church of England church buildings
Church of England church buildings in Bristol
Diocese of Bristol
Clifton Down, Christ Church
Churches in Clifton, Bristol